Paratectonatica tigrina, common name tiger moon snail, is a species of predatory sea snail, a marine gastropod mollusk in the family Naticidae, the moon snails.

Description
Size 28-30mm, with slightly elevated spires. Pale brown colour with faint brown or yellow trans-spiral lines. Commonly crawls on sandy bottom in meso littoral zone.

These shells are pear-shaped and quite thick, with the tip of the spiral sticking out. They have a whitish or pale brown surface with small dark brown or black spots. Operculum is white and quite smooth, usually with yellow and gray patches. The foot of the mollusk is whitish, almost translucent, plain and large.

Distribution
This species occurs in the Red Sea and in the Indian Ocean off Madagascar.
They are also commonly found along the Southeast Indian coast and the Konkan coast up to Kerala.

Paratectonatica tigrina can be found in the Eastern Africa, Southeastern Asia and Australia.

Human uses
In some countries (mainly Indonesia and Japan) these sea snails are collected for food and the shells are traded.

Fossil records

This species is known in the fossil record from the Oligocene epoch to the Quaternary period (age range 23.03 to 0.0 million years ago.). Fossils have been collected in the sediments of Austria, Germany, India, Italy and Thailand.

References

 Dautzenberg, Ph. (1929). Mollusques testacés marins de Madagascar. Faune des Colonies Francaises, Tome III
 Proud, A. J. (1977). An ecological survey of the D' Aguilar Peninsula, Hong Kong, with recommendations for its future management. Mphil thesis. The University of Hong Kong.
 Torigoe K. & Inaba A. (2011). Revision on the classification of Recent Naticidae. Bulletin of the Nishinomiya Shell Museum. 7: 133 + 15 pp., 4 pls

External links
 Röding, P.F. (1798). Museum Boltenianum sive Catalogus cimeliorum e tribus regnis naturæ quæ olim collegerat Joa. Fried Bolten, M. D. p. d. per XL. annos proto physicus Hamburgensis. Pars secunda continens Conchylia sive Testacea univalvia, bivalvia & multivalvia. Trapp, Hamburg. viii, 199 pp
 [J.-B. M. de. (1822). Histoire naturelle des animaux sans vertèbres. Tome sixième, 2me partie. Paris: published by the Author, 232 pp]
 Perry, G. (1811). Conchology, or the natural history of shells: containing a new arrangement of the genera and species, illustrated by coloured engravings executed from the natural specimens, and including the latest discoveries. 4 pp., 61 plates. London
 Deshayes, G. P. & Milne-Edwards, H. (1838). Histoire naturelle des animaux sans vertèbres, présentant les caractères généraux et particuliers de ces animaux, leur distribution, leurs classes, leurs familles, leurs genres, et la citation des principales espèces qui s'y rapportent, par J.B.P.A. de Lamarck. Deuxième édition, Tome huitième. Histoire des Mollusques. J. B. Baillière: Paris. 660 pp
  Kang, D.-R.; Tan, K. S.; Liu, L.-L. (2018). Egg-collar morphology and identity of nine species of Naticidae (Gastropoda) in Taiwan, with an assessment of their phylogenetic relationships. Journal of Molluscan Studies. 84: 354–378
 Animal Base

Naticidae
Gastropods described in 1798